Maxwell Lock and Dam is a navigational lock and gated dam on the Monongahela River between Centerville in Washington County, and Luzerne Township in Fayette County in Pennsylvania.  It is part of a series of dams that canalizes the Monongahela to a depth of at least  for its entire length from Fairmont, West Virginia to Pittsburgh, Pennsylvania.  It is maintained by the U.S. Army Corps of Engineers, Pittsburgh District.

Maxwell has two lock chambers located on the right-descending river bank.

History
Construction on Maxwell Lock and Dam began in 1960 and was completed in 1965. It replaced old Lock and Dam 6 at Rices Landing, Pennsylvania.

See also
List of crossings of the Monongahela River

References

Buildings and structures in Fayette County, Pennsylvania
Buildings and structures in Washington County, Pennsylvania
Dams in Pennsylvania
Monongahela River
United States Army Corps of Engineers, Pittsburgh District
United States Army Corps of Engineers dams
Dams completed in 1965
Transportation buildings and structures in Fayette County, Pennsylvania
Transportation buildings and structures in Washington County, Pennsylvania